Matthew Trott (born 26 April 1980) is a New Zealand rower.

Trott was born in 1980 in Ashburton, New Zealand. He started rowing at age 15 and was a member of Canterbury Rowing Club. He represented New Zealand at the 2012 Summer Olympics. He is listed as New Zealand Olympian athlete number 1220 by the New Zealand Olympic Committee. After seven years with New Zealand's elite squad, he retired at the end of 2012 and became a rural banker.

References

1980 births
Living people
New Zealand male rowers
Rowers at the 2012 Summer Olympics
Olympic rowers of New Zealand
Sportspeople from Ashburton, New Zealand